R614 road may refer to:
 R614 road (Ireland)
 R614 road (South Africa)